FuelCell Energy, Inc. is a publicly traded fuel cell company, headquartered in Danbury, Connecticut. It designs, manufactures, operates and services Direct Fuel Cell power plants (a type of molten carbonate fuel cell). The company's fuel cell technology is an alternative to traditional combustion-based power generation, and is complementary to intermittent sources of energy, such as solar and wind turbines. As one of the biggest publicly traded fuel cell manufacturers in the U.S., the company provides clean energy in over 50 locations all over the world. It operates the world’s largest fuel cell park, Gyeonggi Green Energy Fuel cell park, which is located in South Korea. The park consists of 21 power plants providing 59 Megawatt of electricity plus district heating to a number of customers in South Korea. It also operates the largest fuel cell park in North America, consisting of five 2.8MW power plants and a rankine cycle turbine bottoming cycle in Bridgeport, Connecticut. Its customer base  covers commercial and industrial enterprises  including utility companies, municipalities, universities, etc.

History
The company was founded as Energy Research Corporation (ERC) in 1969 by early fuel cell pioneers Bernard Baker and Martin Klein, who are both chemical engineers with professional knowledge in advanced battery technologies. From the 1970s to 1990s, with sponsorship from U.S. military and other utility companies, the company extended to low-temperature fuel cell area and high-temperature carbonate fuel systems, which proved to have greater potential in commercial applications. It completed its IPO in 1992 and was renamed as FuelCell Energy, Inc. It spun off its battery division, Evercel, in 1999. FuelCell Energy began expanding globally in 2007 through a partnership with POSCO Energy, targeting markets in Southeast Asia, particularly South Korea, but the company announced the termination of the partnership in 2020.

In 2012, the company’s European facility was established with German-based FuelCell Energy Solutions, GmbH. In the same year, it completed a joint venture with Fraunhofer IKTS and acquired Versa Power Systems, Inc.

Beginning in 2012, FuelCell entered into a partnership with ExxonMobil, removing carbon dioxide from the exhaust of Exxon’s power plants and locking it in the ground through a process called carbon capture and sequestration (CCS). In 2019, the two companies expanded their joint-development agreement, with a focus on enhancing carbonate fuel cell technology for the purpose of capturing carbon dioxide from industrial facilities.

In 2017 FuelCell entered an agreement with Toyota to develop a facility at Long Beach, California. The Tri-Gen system will convert California agricultural waste into 2.35 megawatts of electricity and 1.2 tons of hydrogen per day. The hydrogen will be used in Toyota Mirai sedans and heavy-duty trucks in short-distance fleets.

Also in 2017, FuelCell was tapped by the Office of Naval Research to provide assistance on the Large Displacement Unmanned Undersea Vehicle (LDUUV) program. The LDUUV is a large unmanned submersible with a planned 70 day plus endurance that would allow the LDUUV to be based at a pier like a traditional submarine instead of requiring a dedicated launch and recovery platform.

In 2018, FuelCell Energy earned a $1.5 million research grant from the U.S. Department of Energy (DOE) to develop the company’s fuelcell technology to aid the nuclear industry by converting excess power back into hydrogen. That same year, FuelCell began the construction of two plants in Hartford and New Britain as part of a clean energy procurement process for the Connecticut Department of Energy and Environmental Protection (DEEP).

In November 2018, FuelCell acquired a 14.9-MW fuel cell project in Bridgeport, Connecticut from Dominion Energy for $37 million. FuelCell had developed, built and been operating the plant since 2013. The plant is powered by five FuelCell stationary fuel cell power plants and an organic rankine turbine that converts heat from the fuel cells into additional electricity, which is sold to Connecticut Light & Power.

In 2019, FuelCell entered an agreement with Drax Power Station in the UK. FuelCell will support a study to evaluate the use of the company’s carbonate fuel cells to capture carbon dioxide emissions from Drax’s biomass boilers, which generate power with sustainable wood pellets sourced from responsibly managed forests.

In August 2019, Jason Few was named FuelCell’s new president and CEO. Prior to FuelCell, Few was president of cloud-based software waste and recycling optimization company Sustayn.

In May 2021, FuelCell Energy signed an $8 million contract with the DOE. The DOE program is focused on developing system approaches to achieve electrical efficiency with solid oxide fuel cell (SOFC) technology. It will allow FuelCell to continue research and development toward commercialization of SOFC.

In June 2021, FuelCell completed construction on a bio-fuels fuel cell project with the city of San Bernardino Municipal Water Department (SBMWD). The SureSource 1500 plant treats the city’s anaerobic digester gas to produce electricity and thermal energy to support the county’s water reclamation plant. As part of the agreement, SBMWD purchases electricity from FuelCell Energy.

Products and services
FuelCell provides on-site power generation, combined heat and power, distributed hydrogen, carbon capture and hydrogen-based long duration storage. The company today has fuel cell projects that run on natural gas and renewable biogas. The company’s products can produce hydrogen in addition to power and thermal attributes. Additionally, the company has capabilities for fuel cell-based carbon capture, long-duration energy storage and solid-oxide based electrolysis.

FuelCell’s proprietary technology uses carbonate fuel cells to capture and concentrate carbon dioxide from large industrial sources. Combustion exhaust is directed to the fuel cell, which produces power while capturing and concentrating carbon dioxide for permanent storage.  Fuel cells take energy like natural gas or hydrogen, combine that with air, and make electricity. It’s all done via an electrochemical process, which doesn’t burn fuel, making the process cleaner and more efficient than conventional methods.

References

External links

Energy companies of the United States
Companies based in Danbury, Connecticut
Energy companies established in 1969
Non-renewable resource companies established in 1969
1969 establishments in Connecticut
Companies listed on the Nasdaq
1992 initial public offerings